G0, G0, G0, g0, or G-zero, may refer to:

Science
 G0 phase of cell division
 G0 star, a subclass of G-class stars
 Conductance quantum ("quantum of conductance"), notated G0
 Geometric continuity, notated G0
 Group 0, an alternate name for Group 18 of the Periodic table – the Noble gases
 G0, a hypothetical group in the Periodic table, which would consist of neutronium
 Standard gravity, notated g0

Other uses
 G0, abbreviation for ground zero
 G0, the name of the musical note G in octave 0
 G-Zero world – the term used for the emerging power vacuum in international politics in the early 21st Century
 Ghana International Airlines, IATA airline designator G0
 G0, a block of character codes in the Teletext character set

See also

 0G (disambiguation)
 Go (disambiguation)
 Zero-G (disambiguation)